Gordana Čomić (born 16 June 1958) is a Serbian politician who served as minister for human and minority rights and social dialogue from 2020 to 2022. A long-time member of the Democratic Party (DS), she was excluded from the party in 2020 after announcing her opposition to the boycott to the 2020 Serbian parliamentary election. Since then, she has served as an independent politician.

Early life and career
Čomić was born in Novi Sad, Vojvodina, in what was then the People's Republic of Serbia in the Federal People's Republic of Yugoslavia. She trained as a physicist and was employed at the University of Novi Sad's Faculty of Technical Sciences from 1984 to 1999. From 1999 to 2004, she worked in marketing for JP SPC Vojvodina.

Čomić was one of the first Serbian politicians to write a blog, starting in 2006.

Politician

Early years (1992–2001)
Čomić joined the Democratic Party's Novi Sad municipal board in 1992. She later became a party spokesperson at the city and provincial levels, led the party's Novi Sad election headquarters in 1996, and was president of its provincial board from 1998 to 2001.

Čomić appeared on the Democratic Party's electoral lists for Novi Sad in the 1992 and 1993 parliamentary elections, although she was not included in her party's assembly delegation on either occasion. (From 1992 to 2000, Serbia's electoral law stipulated that one-third of parliamentary mandates would be assigned to candidates on successful lists in numerical order, while the remaining two-thirds would be distributed amongst other candidates at the discretion of sponsoring parties or coalitions. Čomić was not given a high enough list position on either occasion to receive an automatic mandate, nor was she granted an optional mandate afterwards.)

The DS contested the 1996 Yugoslavian parliamentary election as part of the Zajedno (English: Together) coalition, and Čomić appeared in the lead position on its electoral list for Zrenjanin. The list did not cross the electoral threshold to win any seats in the division. Čomić was, however, elected to the Assembly of Vojvodina for Novi Sad's thirteenth division in the concurrent 1996 provincial election. The Socialist Party of Serbia (Socijalistička partija Srbije, SPS) won a majority victory, and Čomić led the opposition group in the assembly from 1997 to 2000. At the municipal level, she was a member of Novi Sad's executive committee in 1997, following the victory of Zajedno in that city.

In 2000, the DS became one of the main parties in the Democratic Opposition of Serbia (Demokratska opozicija Srbije, DOS), a broad and ideologically diverse coalition of parties opposed to Slobodan Milošević's authoritarian regime. DOS candidate Vojislav Koštunica defeated Milošević in the 2000 Yugoslavian presidential election, an event that prompted widespread changes in the political culture of Yugoslavia and Serbia. Čomić was re-elected for Novi Sad's tenth division in the concurrent 2000 provincial election; the DOS won a landslide victory at the provincial level, and Čomić served as a deputy speaker of the Vojvodina assembly from 2000 to 2001. She also appeared on the DOS's list for the Yugoslavian Chamber of Republics in 2000, although she did not receive a mandate for that body.

Parliamentarian

2000–12
Serbia's government fell after Milošević's defeat in the Yugoslavian election, and a new Serbian parliamentary election was called for December 2000. Serbia's electoral system was reformed prior to the vote, such that the entire country became a single electoral division and all assembly mandates were assigned to candidates on successful lists at the discretion of the sponsoring parties or coalitions, irrespective of numerical order. Čomić received the twenty-first position on the DOS's electoral list. The list won a landslide majority with 176 out of 250 mandates, and she was included in the DS's delegation when the new assembly convened in January 2001. She became a party vice-president later in the year and served as a deputy speaker of the assembly.

In October 2003, Čomić controversially delayed a vote of no-confidence in the government of Zoran Živković, prompting some opposition members to charge that the delay was simply a method to give the government more time to build a working majority. Speaker Nataša Mićić ultimately dissolved the assembly for new elections on 13 November 2003. The Democratic Party contested the resulting 2003 parliamentary election at the head of its own alliance, and Čomić received the sixth position on its electoral list. The list won thirty-seven seats, and she was again included in her party's delegation. The rival Democratic Party of Serbia (Demokratska stranka Srbije, DSS) emerged at the head of a coalition government after the election, and the Democratic Party served in opposition.

Čomić supported Živković's candidacy against Boris Tadić for the vacant Democratic Party leadership in January 2004. It was reported that Tadić responded by blocking Čomić from becoming the new assembly speaker, a position she had expected to receive. Tadić was chosen as party leader in early 2004, and Čomić was defeated in her concurrent bid for re-election as a party vice-president.

She chaired the foreign affairs committee in the 2004–07 parliament and also served on the committees for environmental protection and European integration. In 2006, she was appointed as part of Serbia's delegation to the Parliamentary Assembly of the Organization for Security and Co-operation in Europe (OSCE PA). She supported Serbia's integration into the European Union and criticized what she regarded as efforts to increase the country's dependence on Russia. In 2006, she worked with parliamentarians from Montenegro on a regional charter of minority rights.

Čomić was again selected for the Democratic Party's assembly delegation after the party's list won sixty-four seats in the 2007 parliamentary election. The party returned to government following the election in an unstable coalition with the DSS and G17 Plus. Čomić served as deputy chair of the environmental protection committee in this term and continued to serve on the European integration committee.

The DS–DSS coalition broke down in early 2008, and a new parliamentary election was called for May of that year. The DS contested the election at the head of the For a European Serbia (Za evropsku Srbiju, ZES) alliance; Čomić was included on its list and received a mandate for a fourth term when the alliance won 102 out of 250 seats. The overall results of the election were inconclusive, but ZES eventually formed a coalition government with the Socialist Party. Čomić was elected to her second term as deputy speaker when the assembly convened. She also served on the foreign affairs and European integration committees, was a member of a working group on the rights of the child and a deputy member of the constitutional affairs committee and the poverty reduction committee, led Serbia's parliamentary friendship group with Israel, and was a member of the friendship groups with Indonesia, Portugal, the Sovereign Order of Malta, and the United States of America.

She indicated her support for the Statute of the Autonomous Province of Vojvodina in January 2009, arguing that it was not a separatist document (as some had suggested) and that it would benefit both Vojvodina and Serbia as a whole.

2012–20
Serbia's electoral system was reformed again in 2011, such that parliamentary mandates were awarded in numerical order to candidates on successful lists. Čomić was given the fifteenth position on the Democratic Party's Choice for a Better Life coalition list in the 2012 election and was re-elected when the list won sixty-seven mandates. This SPS formed a new administration with the Serbian Progressive Party (Srpska napredna stranka, SNS) and other parties after the election, and the DS moved into opposition. Čomić continued to serve in Serbia's delegation to the OSCE PA and was selected by this body as a rapporteur for human rights and migration. She was also a member of the national assembly committees for environmental protection, European integration, and the rights of the child; a deputy member of the committee on human and minority rights and gender equality; and a member of the friendship groups with Hungary, Israel, Mexico, Montenegro, the United Kingdom, and the United States.

In November 2013, Čomić headed an OSCE PA delegation overseeing the 2013 Tajikistani presidential election. She was critical of the way the vote was handled, saying, "While quiet and peaceful, this was an election without a real choice. Being in power requires abiding by OSCE commitments, not taking advantage of incumbency, as we saw here. Greater genuine political pluralism will be critical for Tajikistan to meet its democratic commitments." Čomić later advocated for the OSCE PA's Baku Declaration.

She received the sixth position on the DS's list in the 2014 parliamentary election and was re-elected even as the list fell to only nineteen mandates overall. She remained a member of the European integration committee and the committee on the rights of the child and also served as a deputy member of the environmental protection committee and the committee for human and minority rights and gender equality, and as a member of the friendship groups with Croatia, Germany, Hungary, Ireland, Slovakia, the United Kingdom, and the United States. She ceased to be a full member of Serbia's OSCA PA delegation, becoming instead a deputy member. In June 2014, she was again selected as a DS vice-president.

She was promoted to the fifth position on the DS's list in the 2016 parliamentary election and was re-elected as the list fell to sixteen seats. During the 2016–20 parliament, she was deputy chair of the committee on constitutional and legislative issues; a member of the committee on Kosovo-Metohija, the European integration committee, and the committee on the rights of the child; a deputy member of the environmental protection committee and the defence and internal affairs committee; a deputy member of the European Union–Serbia stabilization and association committee; a member of a commission to "investigate the consequences of the NATO 1999 bombing on the health of the citizens of Serbia, as well as the environment, with a special focus on the impact of the depleted uranium projectiles"; a deputy member of the Serbia's delegation to the South-East European Cooperation Process parliamentary assembly; and a member of the parliamentary friendship groups with Albania, Bosnia and Herzegovina, Croatia, Germany, Israel, the United Kingdom, and the United States. She continued to serve as a deputy speaker of the assembly throughout the DS's years in opposition.

Čomić was an early supporter of Saša Janković's bid for president of Serbia in the 2017 election. Janković was ultimately endorsed by the Democratic Party and finished a distant second against Aleksandar Vučić of the Progressive Party.

The Democratic Party began boycotting the national assembly in early 2019, against the backdrop of significant protests against Serbia's government. Čomić attended an assembly session in defiance of the boycott a year later, defending her decision on the grounds that her purpose was to present draft legislation requiring at least forty per cent representation of women on election lists at both the republic and municipal levels. (The legislation was ultimately successful, and Serbia's electoral laws were changed accordingly.) She was expelled from the DS not long after this.

She contested the 2020 parliamentary election as a non-party candidate, appearing in the fourth position on the electoral list of the United Democratic Serbia (Ujedinjena demokratska Srbija, UDS) alliance. The list did not cross the electoral threshold to win representation in the assembly, and  her term ended on 3 August 2020.

Cabinet minister (2020–2022)
Čomić was appointed to prime minister Ana Brnabić's cabinet in October 2020 as minister of human and minority rights and social dialogue.

In March 2021, Čomić brought forward a draft anti-discrimination law for same-sex unions in Serbia. The legislation extends civic rights to same-sex couples, although it does not address the subjects of marriage or adoption; Čomić contends that those issues are matters of family law, whereas her legislation is focused on human rights concerns. Even the limited rights extended to same-sex unions under the legislation have prompted opposition from more conservative circles. Serbian president Aleksandar Vučić has said that he will not sign the law on the grounds that it violates Serbia's constitution. Čomić has downplayed the importance of Vučić's personal opposition, affirming the law's constitutionality and saying that its validity will ultimately be determined by Serbia's constitutional court. In May 2022, following that year's parliamentary election, she indicated that the draft law had been completed with the help of expert opinion from the Council of Europe and that it was ready for the mandate of Serbia's incoming government.

Electoral record

Provincial (Vojvodina)

Notes

References

1958 births
Living people
Politicians from Novi Sad
21st-century Serbian women politicians
21st-century Serbian politicians
Members of the National Assembly (Serbia)
Deputy Members of the South-East European Cooperation Process Parliamentary Assembly
Members of the Parliamentary Assembly of the Organization for Security and Co-operation in Europe
Democratic Party (Serbia) politicians
Members of the Assembly of Vojvodina
Women government ministers of Serbia
Women members of the National Assembly (Serbia)